Jeffrey James Frazee (born May 13, 1987) is an American former professional ice hockey goaltender. He last played for HDD Olimpija Ljubljana of the Austrian Hockey League. He played one game in the National Hockey League with the New Jersey Devils during the 2012–13 season.

Early life
Frazee was born in Edina, Minnesota, but grew up in Burnsville, Minnesota.

Playing career 
He was drafted in the second round, 38th overall, by the New Jersey Devils in the 2005 NHL Entry Draft.

In Frazee's freshman and sophomore seasons at the University of Minnesota, he played in 32 games, compiling a 20-6-3 record. At the end of the 2007-08 hockey season, Frazee joined the Lowell Devils. He played in one game, making 22 saves in his AHL debut against the Worcester Sharks. He was promoted to Lowell in 2008 after Martin Brodeur went on IR in November and the Devils called up Scott Clemmensen. Frazee was selected to play in the 2009 AHL All-Star Game in Worcester, MA, where he played alongside the best players in the AHL, and former college teammate Ryan Potulny. On February 19, 2009, Frazee won against the Albany River Rats to set a new Lowell Devils franchise record for wins in a season with 21.

With the injury of Martin Brodeur in March 2013 Frazee was called up to act Johan Hedberg back-up along with Keith Kinkaid. Jeff Frazee then made his NHL debut in a 6-3 loss to the Carolina Hurricanes on March 9, 2013 at the PNC Arena. On August 23, 2013, it was announced that Frazee had signed with HC Valpellice of the Italian Elite A. He started the following season at SønderjyskE Ishockey, but left the Danish team in the course of the season to join the Kassel Huskies of the German DEL2.

In 2015-16, he helped Esbjerg Energy win the Danish championship. On July 6, 2016, Frazee inked a deal with HDD Olimpija Ljubljana, a Slovenian side competing in the Austrian Hockey League (EBEL). He left HDD Olimpija Ljubljana after the 2016-17 season.

Career statistics

Regular season and playoffs

International

References

External links
 

1987 births
Living people
Albany Devils players
American men's ice hockey goaltenders
Esbjerg Energy players
Ice hockey players from Minnesota
Kassel Huskies players
Lowell Devils players
Minnesota Golden Gophers men's ice hockey players
New Jersey Devils draft picks
New Jersey Devils players
People from Burnsville, Minnesota
People from Edina, Minnesota
Trenton Devils players
USA Hockey National Team Development Program players
HC Valpellice players